The Rivière des Pins is a freshwater stream, in Quebec, in Canada. This river crosses the municipalities of:
 Notre-Dame-des-Anges in the Mékinac Regional County Municipality, in the administrative region of Mauricie;
 Saint-Ubalde, in the MRC of Portneuf Regional County Municipality, in the administrative region of Capitale-Nationale.

The White River flows mainly in agricultural and forest environments, being the main economic activities of this small valley.

The lower part of this valley is served by the Chemin du Lac-Blanc which surrounds Lac Blanc, and the Verrette road. The upper part is served by the paths around Lac des Pins (ch. du Lac-des-Pins, rue Carpentier, rue des Pins, rue Gingras) and the chemin du Lac-de-la-Galette and the chemin des Quatre Côtes.

The surface of the Blanche River (except the rapids areas) is generally frozen from the beginning of December to the end of March; however, safe circulation on the ice is generally from late December to early March. The water level of the river varies with the seasons and the precipitation; the spring flood occurs in March or April.

Geography 
The Blanche River has its source at Lac de la Galette (length:  in the shape of a T; altitude of ), in Notre-Dame-de-Montauban. This lake supplies two streams and the outlet of Lac à l'Équerre. This lake is mainly located in the forest area for the eastern part. Lac de la Galette has a few chalets on its west shore.

  southerly in a straight line, crossing an area of marshland including a small lake, collecting an unidentified stream (coming from the west) and the outlet (coming from the north- west) of Lac du Canard, and crossing on  Lac des Pins until at its mouth. Note: This lake is famous for vacationing because about 35 cottages are built there;
  to the south by crossing the Lac-du-Castor road, then the Verrette road, to the outlet (coming from the east) from Lac to Saint-Pierre;
  to the south by collecting the discharge (coming from the east) from four small unidentified lakes and the discharge (coming from the west) from some small unidentified lakes, up to the north shore of Blanc Lake.

From the mouth of the Pins River, the current flows on:
  to the south by crossing Lac Blanc;
  towards the south following the course of the Blanche River (Saint-Casimir);
  southwards following the course of the Noire River (Sainte-Anne River);
  southwards following the course of the Sainte-Anne River (Mauricie) to the northwest shore of the Saint-Laurent river.

Toponymy 
The toponym "Rivière des Pins" (Notre-Dame-des-Anges and Saint-Ubalde) was formalized on May 7, 1981, at the Place Names Bank of the Commission de toponymie du Québec.

See also 

 List of rivers of Quebec

References

Bibliography

External links 
 

Rivers of Mauricie
Rivers of Capitale-Nationale
Mékinac Regional County Municipality